The year 1955 was the 174th year of the Rattanakosin Kingdom of Thailand. It was the 10th year in the reign of King Bhumibol Adulyadej (Rama IX), and is reckoned as year 2498 in the Buddhist Era.

Incumbents
King: Bhumibol Adulyadej
Crown Prince: (vacant)
Prime Minister: Plaek Phibunsongkhram
Supreme Patriarch: Vajirananavongs

Events

January

February

March

April
2 April - Queen Sirikit gives birth to a third child and second daughter Sirindhorn.

May

June

July

August

September

October

November

December

Births
2 April - Sirindhorn Thai Princess

Deaths

See also
 List of Thai films of 1955
 1955 in Thai television

References

External links

 
Thailand
Years of the 20th century in Thailand
Thailand
1950s in Thailand